Central Falls is a city in Providence County, Rhode Island, United States. The population was 22,583 at the 2020 census. With an area of only , it is the smallest and most densely populated city in the smallest state, and the 27th most densely populated incorporated place in the United States. It is also one of only four incorporated places in New England that have a higher population density than the city of Boston (ranking fourth, behind the Massachusetts cities of Somerville, Chelsea and Cambridge, all inner suburbs of Boston). The city takes its name from a waterfall on the Blackstone River.

In May 2010, Central Falls went into receivership, then filed for bankruptcy August 1, 2011. After cutting jobs and services, Central Falls came out of bankruptcy in September 2012.

History 

Prior to the arrival of Europeans the area was home to Nipmuc, Wampanoag and Narragansett peoples.

Central Falls has historic significance as being the site of a major battle during King Philip's War.  It was here on March 26, 1676, that Narragansett Indians ambushed Captain Michael Pierce and his Plymouth Colony troops who (with 20 Christian Wampanoag Indians) were pursuing them.  Nearly all those ambushed were killed, including nine taken prisoner and later tortured to death at nearby Cumberland, Rhode Island.  A stone memorial marks the mass grave at the site known as "Nine Men's Misery".

In the 18th century, Captain Stephen Jenks built a trip hammer and blacksmith shop along the Blackstone River, forming the nucleus of what would eventually become Central Falls. Other manufacturers, including a chocolate maker, set up shop in the building, and the new village became known as Chocolateville.

In 1824, Stephen Jenks suggested the name Central Falls, thus giving the village its permanent name. Central Falls was incorporated as a town in 1730.

Originally, Central Falls was one of the many villages within the town of Smithfield, but in 1871, having experienced a growth spurt, it split into three smaller towns: Smithfield, North Smithfield and Lincoln. Central Falls then became part of the town of Lincoln.  Lincoln experienced its own growth spurt, so in 1895 Lincoln split into two towns, giving rise to the city of Central Falls.

While Quakers made up the majority of the first European settlers in the area, they were soon followed by a diverse mix of immigrants from Ireland, Scotland and French Canada. By the 20th century, Central Falls had experienced its own population explosion and for a while was the most densely populated city in the United States. In recent decades, a large number of Hispanic immigrants have resided in Central Falls. Central Falls has historically been an extremely diverse city, so much so that when the city celebrated its 100th anniversary with a parade in 1995, more than 100 countries were represented.

Geography

Central Falls is located at  (41.889863, −71.392606).

It is drained by the Blackstone River.

Demographics

As of the census[1] of 2000, there were 18,928 people, 6,696 households, and 4,359 families residing in the city. The racial makeup of the city was 57.16% White, 5.82% African American, 0.57% Native American, 0.68% Asian, 0.04% Pacific Islander, 28.35% from other races, and 7.38% from two or more races. Hispanic or Latino of any race were 47.77% of the population.

There were 6,696 households, out of which 38.9% had children under the age of 18 living with them, 36.4% were married couples living together, 21.6% had a female householder with no husband present, and 34.9% were non-families. 29.3% of all households were made up of individuals, and 12.7% had someone living alone who was 65 years of age or older. The average household size was 2.74 and the average family size was 3.38.

In the city, the population was spread out, with 29.2% under the age of 18, 11.8% from 18 to 24, 31.6% from 25 to 44, 15.8% from 45 to 64, and 11.5% who were 65 years of age or older. The median age was 30 years. For every 100 females, there were 98.7 males. For every 100 females age 18 and over, there were 93.7 males.

The median income for a household in the city was $22,628, and the median income for a family was $26,844. Males had a median income of $23,854 versus $18,544 for females. The per capita income for the city was $10,825. About 25.9% of families and 29.0% of the population were below the poverty line, including 40.8% of those under age 18 and 29.3% of those age 65 or over.

As of the 2010 U.S. Census, Central Falls was the only majority-minority municipality in Rhode Island with 60.31 percent of its residents identifying as Hispanic/Latino with Puerto Ricans, Guatemalans, and Colombians making up the largest share among the ethnicity.

According to the U.S. Census Bureau's American Community Survey, Central Falls had a median household income of $28,901 during the 2012-2016 estimates, making it the poorest municipality in Rhode Island.

Education

Residents are served by the Central Falls School District. This school district is funded and appointed by the State of Rhode Island Department of Education.

In February 2010, the entire faculty and administrative staff of Central Falls High School was fired after the teachers' union refused to accept one of the "No Child Left Behind" options for restructuring failing schools.  In accordance with NCLB legislation, schools deemed failing have four options to follow for restructuring. The superintendent proceeded and chose the "turnaround model", which requires a district to fire the entire staff (teachers and administrators). They may rehire up to 50% of the teachers for the beginning of the next school year. The school has a graduation rate of around 50%, and 7% of 11th-graders were proficient in mathematics in 2009. This school had been identified as one of the worst in the state. The teachers union sued the school district, challenging the requirement that teachers must reapply for their jobs. The Obama administration sided with the school board. In May 2010, the teachers were rehired when they agreed to work the extra time required.

As of the year 2000 US census, 5.9% of Central Falls residents age 25 and older have a bachelor's or advanced college degree.

There has been at least one Catholic school present in Central Falls since 1895. By 1908, there were three: St. Matthew's, Holy Trinity,  and Notre Dame. In 1995, these three schools were combined to create St. Elizabeth Ann Seton Academy, which is located in the building originally serving St. Matthew's.  Currently, St. Elizabeth Ann Seton Academy is the only non-public school in Central Falls.

Government

In the Rhode Island Senate, Central Falls is included in the 16th District and is currently represented by Democrat Jonathan Acosta. At the federal level, Central Falls is a part of Rhode Island's 1st congressional district, represented by Democrat David N. Cicilline.

The city is governed by a Mayor-Council type government led by Mayor Maria Rivera. The City Council consists of five wards and is represented by Jonathan Acosta, Robert Ferri, Hugo Figueroa, Franklin Solano, and Jessica Vega. 

The Pawtucket Water Supply Board owns and operates the water system.

Issues
On April 25, 2010, the Providence Journal Bulletin ran an article detailing rampant fraud and corruption by Mayor Charles D. Moreau, outlining no-bid contracts and kickbacks from a high school friend, who was granted almost $2 million in overpriced property boarding fees. The article further states that the same friend gave him a $6,875 furnace for his own home for only $6,000, which Moreau said he paid 'in cash'. The friend in question, Michael G. Bouthillette, was a campaign contributor to Moreau's multiple re-election campaigns. These allegations and others are currently being investigated by the Rhode Island State Police.

Financial straits of the city government of Central Falls have worsened in the 2000s as the state cut money to cities and towns, and pensions and pensioner health insurance for city employees accumulated to the extent that the city government declared insolvency in May 2010 and went into receivership.  On August 1, 2011 Central Falls filed for bankruptcy under Chapter 9, Title 11 of the United States Code. It made the filing as it grappled with an $80 million unfunded pension and retiree health benefit liability that is over five times its annual budget of $17 million.

Presidential Election Voting
Like most other majority-minority urban municipalities, Central Falls is overwhelmingly Democratic in presidential elections. No Republican has come remotely close to winning the city in over three decades, during which time voters have consistently backed Democratic nominees with lopsided majorities.

National historic places in Central Falls
 Central Falls Congregational Church
 Central Falls Mill Historic District
 Central Street School
 Samuel B. Conant House
 David G. Fales House
 Benjamin F. Greene House
 Holy Trinity Church
 Jenks Park & Cogswell Tower
 South Central Falls Historic District
 St. Joseph Church
 St. Matthew Church (now Holy Spirit Parish)
 Valley Falls Mill
 Valley Falls Mill, Office and Bath House

Notable people

 Lincoln Carter Almond, 72nd Governor of Rhode Island; grew up in Central Falls
 Michael Breault, game designer, editor and author; born in Central Falls
 Malcolm Greene Chace, financier, head of Berkshire Fine Spinning Associates; born in Central Falls
 Francis Condon, US congressman representing Rhode Island's 1st congressional district; born in Central Falls
 Viola Davis, Academy Award-winning actress; grew up in Central Falls
 James Diossa, politician, born in Central Falls
 Carl Russell Fish, historian and professor at the University of Wisconsin–Madison; born in Central Falls
 Roland Hemond, executive for several Major League Baseball teams; born in Central Falls
 Jack McGee, aviation pioneer; born in Central Falls
 Glyn O'Malley, playwright; grew up in Central Falls
 Charles Risk, US congressman representing Rhode Island's 1st congressional district; born in Central Falls
 John Robitaille, US Army captain; unsuccessful politician Rhode Island gubernatorial candidate (2010); born in Central Falls
 Max Surkont, baseball player, Pittsburgh Pirates, Chicago White Sox and Boston Braves; born in Central Falls

See also

 Valley Falls Company
Lorenzo de Nevers
Donald_W._Wyatt_Detention_Facility
Project Weber/RENEW

References

External links

 City of Central Falls
 Adams Memorial Library
 Blackstone Valley Historical Society

 
Cities in Providence County, Rhode Island
Providence metropolitan area
Government units that have filed for Chapter 9 bankruptcy
Cities in Rhode Island
Hispanic and Latino American culture in Rhode Island